Hannivka is a settlement in Kryvyi Rih Raion, Dnipropetrovsk Oblast, Ukraine on the Dnipropetrovsk Oblast-Kherson Oblast border.

History

Russian invasion of Ukraine
During the 2022 Russian invasion of Ukraine, Hannivka was occupied on 16 March 2022. Hannivka was reported liberated on 11 May 2022.

On 9 May 2022, Russia shelled Hannivka.

On 23 July 2022, Russia shelled Hannivka.

References

Ukraine
Dnipropetrovsk Oblast
Kryvyi Rih Raion